Markus Stappung is a Swiss orienteering competitor. He participated at the 1987 World Orienteering Championships in Gérardmer, where he won a silver medal in the relay, together with Stefan Bolliger, Kaspar Öttli and Urs Flühmann.

References

Year of birth missing (living people)
Living people
Swiss orienteers
Male orienteers
Foot orienteers
World Orienteering Championships medalists